Wallingford is an unincorporated community in Fleming County, Kentucky, United States. Wallingford has a post office with ZIP code 41093.

References

Unincorporated communities in Fleming County, Kentucky
Unincorporated communities in Kentucky